Dehkaram (also known as Shāhkaram and Shāh Karam) is a village in Baraan-e Jonubi Rural District, in the Central District of Isfahan County, Isfahan Province, Iran. At the 2006 census, its population was 671, in 159 families.

References 

Populated places in Isfahan County